Glomeridesmidae, is a millipede family of the order Glomeridesmida. This family includes two genera: The genus Glomeridesmus includes most species in this family; the genus Glomeridesmoides includes one species.

Most adult females in this family have 36 pairs of legs and 21 segments, counting 20 tergites plus the anal shield. Male specimens in this family are rare and known for only a small number of species. Descriptions of mature males in at least four species (Glomeridesmus spelaeus, G. siamensis, G. arcostriatus, and G. marmoreus) report 35 pairs of legs, including a pair of telopods, and 20 segments, one fewer than the 21 segments found in adult females. The description of an adult male of another species (G. indus), however, reports 37 pairs of legs, including a pair of telopods, and the same 21 segments normally found in adult females. Furthermore, the description of a species from another genus (Glomeridesmoides termitophilus) reports some deviations from the usual pattern, describing females with the usual 21 segments but only 35 leg pairs and two males with the same 21 segments (with 34 and 35 leg pairs, including a pair of telopods). Millipedes in this family develop by hemianamorphosis, with leg and segment number decoupled such that individuals may reach the full complement of one before the other.

Genera
Glomeridesmoides

Glomeridesmus

References

Millipede families
Glomeridesmida